Nemopsis is a genus of cnidarians belonging to the family Bougainvilliidae.

The species of this genus are found in Europe and Northern America.

Species:
 Nemopsis bachei Agassiz, 1849 
 Nemopsis dofleini Maas, 1909

References

Bougainvilliidae
Hydrozoan genera